The A4, A44 and M4 are a collection of arterial routes in Sydney, New South Wales that connect the Inner West of Sydney with the outer western suburbs. 

The A4 and M4 mostly follows what was previously National Route 32 from the Western Distributor in the CBD, west to the Great Western Highway at Lapstone. Both the A4 and M4 sections were known as Metroad 4 until 2013, which in turn replaced the previous Sydney stretch of National Route 32 in September 1992 while the A44 was known as State Route 44 until 2013. The remaining section of the A4 could also become part of the M4 once the Rozelle Interchange is open to the public.

The names "M4", "A44" and "A4" are just the route allocations for the route as a whole. In fact, the A4/M4 route runs along a whole series of roads with the A44 running parallel to the M4 before merging onto the City West Link. The roads from east to west are:
 A44 section:
 Victoria Road
 The Crescent
 City West Link
 Dobroyd Parade
 Wattle Street
 Great Western Highway/Parramatta Road (West of Wattle Street Intersection)
 A4 section:
 Western Distributor
 M4 section:
 M4 East
 Western Motorway

History

The earliest route allocation of M4/A4 is National Route 32. It was introduced in 1954 with other National Routes. Most of the 1954 alignment of National Route 32 in Sydney is very different from the current M4/A4 alignment in Sydney. Back then National Route 32 ran along the entire Great Western Highway from  via the Blue Mountains to Broadway, Sydney.

With the opening of the M4 Motorway in 1992, National Route 32 was truncated and terminated at Lapstone in Blue Mountains instead. Metroad 4 was introduced to replace the Sydney section of National Route 32, but went along the motorway instead of Great Western Highway from Lapstone to North Strathfield. This was the first Metroad to be introduced in Sydney. The section of Great Western Highway that was formerly National Route 32 was allocated State Route 44 which is now A44.

In 2000, when the City West Link opened, Metroad 4 was realigned to Wattle Street, Dobroyd Parade, City West Link, Victoria Road and Western Distributor and terminated at the junction of Cahill Expressway, Western Distributor and Bradfield Highway in Millers Point.

In 2013, as part of the state-wide alpha numeric route conversion, the Metroad 4 was replaced by M4 for the motorway and A4 for the non-motorway section.

In July 2019, the A4 between Strathfield and Haberfield was realigned onto the new M4 East tunnels and was redesignated M4. This meant that A4 no longer runs along any section of Parramatta Road or Great Western Highway.

See also

References

Sydney Metroads